The 1921 All-Western college football team consists of American football players selected to the All-Western teams chosen by various selectors for the 1921 college football season.

All-Western selections

Ends

 Fritz Crisler, Chicago (COL-1, WE-1) (CFHOF)
 Lester Belding, Iowa (COL-1, WE-2)
 Truck Myers, Ohio State (WE-1)
 Paul G. Goebel, Michigan (COL-2, WE-3)
 Gus Tebell, Wisconsin (COL-2, WE-3)
 Stevens Gould, Wisconsin (WE-2)

Tackles
 Duke Slater, Iowa (COL-1, WE-1) (CFHOF)
 Charles McGuire, Chicago (COL-1, WE-1)
 Iolas Huffman, Ohio State (COL-2, WE-2)
 James Brader, Wisconsin (COL-2, WE-2)
 Robert H. Spiers, Ohio State (WE-3)
 Ed Carman, Purdue (WE-3)

Guards
 Dean W. Trott, Ohio State (COL-1, WE-1)
 Lloyd Pixley, Ohio State (COL-1)
 Robert J. Dunne, Michigan (WE-1)
 Charles Redmon, Chicago (COL-2, WE-2)
 Ferdinand Birk, Purdue (COL-2)
 Albert W. T. Mohr, Jr., Illinois (WE-2)
 Paul Minick, Iowa (WE-3)
 William G. McCaw, Indiana (WE-3)

Centers
 George C. Bunge, Wisconsin (COL-1, WE-2)
 Ernie Vick, Michigan (COL-2, WE-1) (CFHOF)
 John C. Heldt, Iowa (WE-3)

Quarterbacks
 Aubrey Devine, Iowa (COL-1, WE-1) (CFHOF)
 Hoge Workman, Ohio State (COL-2)
 Milton Romney, Chicago (WE-2)
 Irwin Uteritz, Michigan (WE-3)

Halfbacks
 Alvah Elliott, Wisconsin (COL-1, WE-1)
 Roland Williams, Wisconsin (COL-1)
 Don Peden, Illinois (WE-1)
 John D. Stuart, Ohio State (COL-2, WE-3)
 Stevens Gould, Wisconsin (COL-2)
 Franklin Cappon, Michigan (WE-2)
 Laurie Walquist, Illinois (WE-2)
 Earl Martineau, Minnesota (WE-3)

Fullbacks
 Gordon Locke, Iowa (COL-1, WE-1) (CFHOF)
 Guy Sundt, Wisconsin (COL-2, WE-3)
 Thomas, Chicago (WE-2)

Key
COL = Collier's Weekly selected by E. C. Patterson and Billy Evans

WE = Walter Eckersall in the Chicago Tribune (all-conference)

CFHOF = College Football Hall of Fame

See also
1921 College Football All-America Team
1921 All-Big Ten Conference football team

References

1921 Big Ten Conference football season
All-Western college football teams